Buriano is a village in Tuscany, central Italy, administratively a frazione of the comune of Montecatini Val di Cecina, province of Pisa.

The village is a ghost town since it was abandoned in 1998. Buriano is about 68 km from Pisa and 15 km from Montecatini Val di Cecina.

References

Bibliography 
 
 
 

Frazioni of the Province of Pisa